Husarivka is a village in Barvinkove urban hromada, Izium Raion, Kharkiv Oblast, Ukraine. It had 575 inhabitants before the 2022 Russian invasion of Ukraine.

The village was liberated on April 4, 2022. The bodies of a number of residents who had been killed were found.

References

Villages in Izium Raion